Orbit Communications Company was a privately owned Pay TV network, operating in Bahrain. Owned by Saudi Arabia-based Mawarid Holding (via Digital Media Systems), it was the first fully digital, multi-channel, multi-lingual, pay television service in the Middle East and North Africa and was also the world's first fully end to end digital TV network. Launched in 1994, it was originally situated in Tor Sapienza, Rome, Italy as the location was considered entirely suitable to build a satellite farm. Orbit employed around 600 employees who were largely a combination of British and Italian staff with several Arabic speaking nations also represented. Orbit broadcast in several languages around the world including English, Arabic, French and Filipino.

Some of Orbit's Arabic channels including Bahrain TV, Al Safwa, Fann, Al Yawm, Cinema 1, Cinema 2, Mousalsalat and Mousalsalat +2 are available throughout North and South America through myTV (Arabic).

In 2009, the company merged with Showtime Arabia to form OSN, which is currently the biggest pay-TV provider in the MENA region.

Technology
Orbit had launched 4 multi-function interactive decoders:
 XD 200-Humax
 XD 200-Technosat
 XD 300-Philips
 XD 400-Humax (PVR - Personal Video Recorder)

This allowed the following features:

 2-level parental control (Channel & Rating).
 7-day bilingual electronic program guide.
 22 radio channels of music & news & entertainment.
 Arabic subtitles & multi-lingual audio on selected channels.

Channel lineup

Promotional:
Marhaba TV 
TVMAX Promo
Movies Channels:
ART Aflam 1
ART Aflam 2
ART Cinema
Cinema 1
Cinema 2
Star Movies
Super Movies
Super Movies +2
Xtra Movies
Xtra Movies +2
MBC 2
MBC Max
MBC Action
Rotana Cinema
Rotana Comedy
Rotana Classic
Sports:
Edge Sport
Bahrain Sports 1
Bahrain Sports 2
KSA Sports 1
KSA Sports 2
Al Riyadiyah 1
Al Riyadiyah 2
Al Riyadiyah 3
Al Riyadiyah 4
Al Riyadiyah 5
Al Riyadiyah 6
Al Riyadiyah 7
Al Riyadiyah 8
Abu Dhabi Sports 1
Abu Dhabi Sports 2
Abu Dhabi Sports 3
Abu Dhabi Sports 4
Orbit Sports
Orbit ESPN
Orbit Sports 1
Orbit Sports 2
Orbit Sports 3
Orbit Sports 4
Orbit Sports 5
BeIN Sports
BeIN Sports News
BeIN Sports NBA
BeIN Sports Premium
Kids and Education:
Fun Channel
Nickelodeon
Nick Jr.
Nicktoons
Disney Channel
Disney Junior
Spacetoon
BabyTV
CBeebies
The History Channel
The History Channel 2
National Geographic
National Geographic Abu Dhabi
Nat Geo Wild
Discovery Science
Discovery Channel
Discovery ID
Crime Investigation Network
News:
Orbit News
CNBC
CNN International
CNBC Arabiya
Bloomberg Television
Sky News
Sky News Arabia
France 24
Al Arabiya
Al Hadath
Al Jazeera
Al Jazeera English
Al Jazeera Documentary Channel
Fox News
BBC Arabic
BBC World News
Music:
MTV 2000's
MTV Live
Music Now 
Rotana Music
Rotana Clip
Rotana Khalijiah
Wanasah
Series and Lifestyle:
Al Safwa
Al Yawm
Fann
ART Hekayat
ART Hekayat 2
Arabic Series Channel
Arabic Series Channel +2
Super Comedy
Super Comedy +2
America Plus
Star World
E!
Hollywood Star!
Fashion TV
TLC
BBC Prime
BBC Earth
BBC First
BBC Lifestyle
MBC 1
MBC 4
MBC 5
Abu Dhabi TV
Emarat TV
Sharjah TV
Dubai TV
MBC Masr 1
MBC Masr 2
Bahrain TV 
Bahrain International
Bahrain Lawal
Bahrain Quran Kareem Channel
Saudi TV
SBC
Saudi Quran Kareem Channel
Qatar TV
AlRayyan TV
TV5Monde Maghreb Orient
Pay Per View:
TVMAX 1
TVMAX 2 
TVMAX 3
TVMAX SPORTS 1
TVMAX SPORTS 2
TVMAX SPORTS 3
Pinoy:
NBN Pinoy News
PBO - Pinoy Box Office
GMA Pinoy TV
GMA Life TV
Lebanese:
LBCI
Tele Liban
Aghani Aghani TV
MTV One Lebanon
Alfa Channel:
Al Thalitha
AL Oula
Al Thania
Radio:
Monawa't
Tarabiya't
Khalijya't
Radio Rotana
GMA DZBB
Radio Mosaic
BBC World Service Arabic
BBC World Service English
Monte Carlo Doualiya
Al Jazeera Radio
Sky News Arabic
GMA DZBB
DWLS FM
Radio Bahrain Arabic
Radio Bahrain English
AFN Bahrain FM
BFBS Bahrain
The Voice Of Ummah
BBC Radio 3
BBC Radio 4
MBC FM
Panorama FM
Al Arabiya FM
Mood FM
Quran Kareem FM
Free-To-Air:

Up To 500 and more Free-To-Air television and radio channels (including Arabsat, Nilesat, Hotbird... - based on type of connection).

Orbit ESPN's disappearance 
On 1 April 2008, after being on the air since 1994, Orbit ESPN disappeared from the Orbit lineup. This left Orbit without coverage of the NCAA, Major League Baseball, the National Hockey League, Major League Soccer, the National Football League, NASCAR, major golf and tennis tournaments, and the premier action sports franchise in the world, ESPN's X Games.

Fox Sports replaced Orbit ESPN on 13 January 2009.

One of the reasons that break the contract with ESPN is the severe financial problems happened at that time, since 1999-2000 the production graph line has been moved down. In 2009, a major delay in paying salaries for orbit employees in Egypt, Lebanon and KSA for more than 4 months.

BBC Arabic Television 
BBC Arabic Television was originally transmitted via Orbit from 1994 until April 21, 1996, when it was taken off air by Orbit after the channel broadcast an episode of the BBC Panorama program critical of the Saudi Arabian government. Many of the BBC Arabic Television staff then went to work for Al Jazeera. The BBC has since relaunched the channel autonomously in 2008.

Orbit Packages 

(The Following Packages are Orbit's Main Packages) (Packages May differ from Country to Another)

 Super Mega: Super Mega includes all Arabic and Western Orbit TV Channels. Plus, 22 Radio Chanels and 4 TV MAX Channels.
 Super Prime: Super Prime includes only Orbits' Western Channels, plus NBA TV, Al Riyadiyah, Music Now, MTV Arabia. Plus, 22 Radio Channels and 4 TV MAX Channels.
 Alfa: Includes all Orbits' Arabic Channels, plus CNN International and Music Now. Plus, 22 Radio Channels and 4 TV MAX Channels.
 Family: The best in Family entertainment: Al Safwa, Al Yawm, Fann, Music Now, Arabic Series Channel, MTV Arabia, Fun Channel, Cartoon Network, Boomerang, Playhouse Disney, Toon Disney, Disney Channel, Spacetoon, Nickelodeon, The History Channel, Animal Planet, Discovery Science, CNN International, Bloomberg Television, Euronews, CNN International, Al Riyadiyah, NBA TV, Hollywood Channel (Zone Club), BBC Prime, Super Comedy, Discovery Travel & Living, 4 TV MAX channels. Plus, 22 Radio Channels.
 Pinoy Plus: The best in Filipino programming: GMA Pinoy TV, NBN Pinoy News, GMA Life TV. Plus, Cartoon Network, Disney Channel, MGM Movies, Discovery Science, Animal Planet, Hollywood Channel (Zone Club), Fashion TV, Music Now, Trace TV, MTV Arabia, CNN International, NBA TV, 22 Radio Channels and 4 TV MAX Channels.
 Kids: The package includes the best in kids entertainment, documentary channels and sports channels: Fun Channel, Playhouse Disney, Toon Disney, Disney Channel, Spacetoon, Nickelodeon, Cartoon Network, Boomerang, Discovery Science, Animal Planet, The History Channel, NBA TV. Plus, 22 Radio Channels and 4 TV MAX Channels. (Kids package is only available as a second subscription only).

Showtime Arabia merger
On 12 July 2009 Showtime Arabia and Orbit Communications Company announced a merger that created the “biggest Pay-TV platform” in the Middle East and North Africa.

The newly formed company, which is called OSN, is an equal partnership that would offer 70 exclusive channels featuring new movies, sports, series, Arabic content and international shows.

New customers can subscribe to packages featuring Showtime Arabia's and Orbit Communications Company's  programs, while existing subscribers will be able to either retain or upgrade their content. The company will offer HD channels, video on demand and other interactive services.

References

External links 
 Official Site 
  1994 Promotion

1994 establishments in Bahrain
2009 disestablishments in Bahrain
Defunct companies of Bahrain
Defunct mass media in Bahrain
Companies established in 1994
Companies disestablished in 2009
Mass media companies of Bahrain
Direct broadcast satellite services
Arabic-language television stations
Companies based in Manama